Fahire Battalgil (1902 - 1948) was a Turkish ichthyologist who was one of the first women to be appointed as a professor at a university in Turkey.

Name
Battalgil was known as Fahire Akim Hanim during the early part of her life. The surname Battalgil was adopted by her family to comply with the Republic of Turkey's 1934 Surname Law and the spelling of this was changed to Battalgazi from 1943.

Early life
Fahire Akim Hanim was born in Istanbul in 1902, she attended the French school of Notre Dame de Sion in Damascus where her father, Dr Etem Akif Bey, had attended. Her secondary school was the Bezmi Alem High School from where she graduated in 1924. She graduated from the Darülfünun in 1926 with a qualification in Natural Science.

Career
From April 1926 to October 1927 Fahire Akim Hanim had a position at the Tercan Vocational School, now part of Erzincan University where she was assigned to the Faculty of Science on 1 June 1927, being appointed as an assistant in the Institute of Zoology in August 1927. In 1931-32 she went to study at the Sorbonne in Paris in the Department of Zoology and Comparative Anatomy. In 1933, following the reform of Turkish universities, she was appointed as an Associate Professor of Zoology at the University of Istanbul. In November 1935 she participated in an expedition organised by the Fisheries Institute, and many such thereafter. With her colleague Suat Nigar she translated the lectures of Professor Andre Naville and after his sudden death in 1937 she took those lectures herself. In 1937 she became a full Associate Professor, under the German Zoologist Curt Kosswig, and in 1944 she became a full professor. She was Turkey's first zoology doctor and first zoology professor. She died on 20 February 1948 in Istanbul and is buried in a family plot in a cemetery in Beşiktaş.

Legacy
Battalgil was an important figure in Turkish ichthyology discovering a number of new species for Turkey and describing a number of new species of fish to science. Examples include Alburnus adanensis, Barbus oligolepis, Pseudophoxinus caralis and Squalius cephaloides. Species named in honour of Battalgil include Cobitis fahireae, Phoxinellus fahirae and Alburnus battalgilae.

Publications
This is an incomplete list of publications:

1940 Eine neue Cyprinidenart [Yeni bir Cyprinid nev'i], Revue de la Faculté des Sciences de l'Université d'Istanbul, Série B: Sciences Naturelles, 5 (1-2): 74-77 (1-4).
1941 Les poissons des eaux douces de la Turquie [Türkiye'nin tatlısu balıkları], Revue de la Faculté des Sciences de l'Université d'Istanbul, Série B: Sciences Naturelles, 6 (1-2): 170–186.
1944. Türkiye'de yeni tath su bahklari. Nouveau poissons des eaux douces de la Turquie. Revue de la Faculté des Sciences de l'Université d'Instanbul, Série B: Sciences Naturelles, 9(2) [1943]: 126–133

References

1902 births
1948 deaths
Turkish zoologists
Ichthyologists
Women ichthyologists
Turkish women scientists
20th-century zoologists